Dennis Leslie Elliott (born 18 August 1950, in Peckham, London) is a British musician and artist, who was the original drummer for the rock band, Foreigner. He played with the band from 1976 until leaving between 1991 and 1993. He went on to become a sculptor.

Life and career
Dennis Leslie Elliott played the drums with his family band at age five in shows around London.  As a teenager, he joined The Tea Set with his older brother Raymond, who sang and played trumpet. After The Tea Set, he became a member of The Shevelles at age sixteen. At eighteen, he played in the band Ferris Wheel and on their album of the same name. When he was nineteen, Dennis joined the jazz/rock band If and recorded four LPs with the ensemble. They continually toured Europe and the US, where he met and later married Iona Elliott on March 2, 1972. Later that year, Dennis joined The Roy Young Band, touring the UK and Europe and recording four singles with that band over the following year.

In 1974, Elliott toured and played on former Mott the Hoople lead singer Ian Hunter's first solo recording, Ian Hunter. After emigrating to the US in April 1975, he became a US Resident Alien.

He was the original drummer for Foreigner when the band started in 1976. He officially left in January 1993.

After leaving the music industry, Elliott turned to sculpture, working mainly in the medium of wood. Self-taught, many of his works have been vessels made of burlwood, sculpted wall mirrors, wall sculptures, and orbital sculptures.

On June 2, 1990, Elliott and his wife, Iona, were rescued by the US Coast Guard after jumping from their yacht Charisma III, which had caught fire. Elliott became a US citizen in 1993.

On January 9, 2013, he joined Foreigner on stage at the Hard Rock Live in Hollywood, Florida to perform "Hot Blooded". On January 12, 2015 in Sarasota, Florida, Foreigner were joined on stage by original drummer Elliott and former bassist Rick Wills to play "Hot Blooded". Elliott joined his old mates for two songs at Foreigner's show on August 2, 2017 at MidFlorida Credit Union Amphitheater in Tampa, Florida. A pair of '40th Anniversary Reunion Shows’ took place on October 6–7, 2017, at the Soaring Eagle Casino & Resort in Mount Pleasant, Michigan, where the current Foreigner group played one set and the original members consisting of the Head Games-era lineup: Mick Jones, Lou Gramm, Dennis Elliott, Al Greenwood, Ian McDonald and Rick Wills, played the second set and were rejoined at the end with all members. The concerts were filmed for future release.

On August 4, 2018, Elliott again joined a ‘Reunion Show’ at the Buffalo Chip in Sturgis, South Dakota, where the current Foreigner group played one set and the original members played the second and all joined together for the finale.

Discography

The Shevells
1968: "Big City Lights"/"The Coffee Song" (single)

The Ferris Wheel
1970: Ferris Wheel (album)
1970: "Can't Stop Now"/"I Know You Well" (UK single)
1970: "Ugly Duckling"/"I Know You Well" (US single)

IF
1970: If 
1970: If 2
1971: If 3 
1972: If 4 
1972: Waterfall 
1995: Forgotten Roads: The Best of If 
1997: Europe '72
2010: Fibonacci's Number - More Live If
2012: If 2 + Live in Liverpool

The Roy Young Band
1973: "Back Up Train" (single)
1973: "Devil's Daughter" (single) 
1973: "Dig a Hole" (single)
1973: "If You Could Only See Me Now" (single)
2009: The Best of 50 Years (album)

Tony Ashton and Jon Lord
1974: First of the Big Bands

Ian Hunter
1975: Ian Hunter 
1977: Overnight Angels

Foreigner
1977: Foreigner (#4 US)
1978: Double Vision (#3 US, #32 UK)
1979: Head Games (#5 US)
1981: 4 (#1 US, #5 UK)
1982: Records (#10 US, #58 UK)
1984: Agent Provocateur (#4 US, #1 UK)
1987: Inside Information (#15 US, #64 UK)
1991: Unusual Heat
1992: The Very Best ... and Beyond (#123 US, #19 UK)
1993: Classic Hits Live/Best of Live

1994: JukeBox Heroes: The Best Of
1998: The Best of Ballads– I Want to Know What Love Is
1999: The Platinum Collection
2000: Hot Blooded and Other Hits
2000: Jukebox Heroes: The Foreigner Anthology
2002: Complete Greatest Hits (#80 US)
2002: The Definitive (#33 UK)
2004: Hot Blooded and Other Hits
2005: The Essentials 
2008: No End in Sight: The Very Best of Foreigner (#132 US)
2009: Can't Slow Down (#29 US)
2014: The Complete Atlantic Studio Albums 1977-1991

Ian Lloyd
1980: Third Wave Civilization

Mick Jones
1989: "Just Wanna Hold" (single) (#19 US Rock)
1989: Mick Jones (album)

Museum collections
Arkansas Art Center, Decorative Arts Museum - Little Rock, Arkansas
Art Museum of South Texas, Corpus Christi, TX
The Charles A. Wustum Museum of Fine Arts - Racine, Wisconsin
Cincinnati Art Museum, Cincinnati, Ohio
The Contemporary Museum of Art - Honolulu, Hawaii
Craft & Folk Art Museum - Los Angeles, California
The Detroit Institute of Arts - Detroit, Michigan
Fuller Craft Museum - Brockton, Massachusetts
The Gregg Museum of Art & Design, NC State University - Raleigh, NC
Honolulu Museum of Art, Honolulu, HI
Los Angeles County Museum of Art - Los Angeles, California
The Mabel Brady Garven Collection, Yale University Art Gallery - New Haven, Connecticut
The Mint Museum of Craft & Design - Charlotte, North Carolina
Mobile Museum of Art, (formerly, Fine Arts Museum of the South) - Mobile, Alabama
Museum of Arts & Design, formerly The American Craft Museum - New York, New York
Museum of Fine Arts - Boston, Massachusetts
Peabody Essex Museum, Salem, Massachusetts
Racine Art Museum, Racine, Wisconsin
Renwick Gallery of the Smithsonian American Art Museum - Washington, D.C.
The Slater Museum - Norwich, Connecticut
University of Michigan Museum of Art - Ann Arbor, Michigan

Special collections
Columbia Pictures, Star Trek Voyager set - Wall Sculpture - Bleached Maple Burl

References

External links
Dennis Elliott's official website
Askart.com – reference site for Elliott's sculptures

1950 births
Living people
British male drummers
English rock drummers
Foreigner (band) members
Musicians from London
People from Peckham
English sculptors
English emigrants to the United States
Place of birth missing (living people)
If (band) members
Spooky Tooth members